Pierre Blais  (born December 30, 1948) is a Canadian jurist and former politician and Cabinet minister.  He also served as the Chief Justice of the Federal Court of Appeal until his retirement in June 2014.

On May 1, 2015, Blais was appointed as chairman of the Security Intelligence Review Committee by Prime Minister Stephen Harper, replacing Interim Chair Deborah Grey who was stepping down from the Committee. The SIRC was dissolved on July 19, 2019, with the creation of the National Security and Intelligence Review Agency. Blais served as a member of the NSIRA until his term expired on May 1, 2020.

Education

Blais holds both a BA (1968) and an LLL (1976) from Laval University.

Political career

Blais entered the House of Commons of Canada as the Progressive Conservative Member of Parliament (MP) for Bellechasse, Quebec through the 1984 election.

In 1987, Prime Minister Brian Mulroney appointed Blais to Cabinet as Minister of State for agriculture. Two years later, he was promoted to the position of Solicitor-General. In 1990, he became Minister of Consumer and Corporate Affairs and, in 1993, was appointed by Mulroney to the position of Minister of Justice.

Blais retained this position, and added the position of President of the Queen's Privy Council for Canada when Kim Campbell succeeded Mulroney as PC leader and prime minister.

Blais's political career came to an end when he was defeated, along with the Campbell government, in the 1993 election.

Judicial career

A member of both the Quebec and Ontario bar, Blais was appointed a Justice of the Federal Court of Canada, Trial Division, an ex officio member of the Court of Appeal and Judge of the Court Martial Appeal Court of Canada in June 1998.

Through 2004, Blais presided over hearings related to Holocaust denier Ernst Zündel's detention under a National Security Certificate. In February 2005, he ruled that the security certificate was valid and that the government could deport Zundel immediately.

On February 20, 2008, Blais was appointed to the Federal Court of Appeal. On September 9, 2009, he was appointed chief justice of the Federal Court of Appeal.

Blais retired as Chief Justice of the Federal Court of Appeal effective June 23, 2014.

References

External links

1948 births
Members of the 24th Canadian Ministry
Members of the 25th Canadian Ministry
Members of the King's Privy Council for Canada
Members of the House of Commons of Canada from Quebec
Progressive Conservative Party of Canada MPs
Lawyers in Quebec
Judges in Quebec
Living people
People from Chaudière-Appalaches
Université Laval alumni
Judges of the Federal Court of Appeal (Canada)
Solicitors General of Canada
Judges of the Court Martial Appeal Court of Canada